Mechele Dickerson is an American lawyer, currently the Arthur L. Moller Chair in Bankruptcy and Practice and University Distinguished Teaching Professor at University of Texas School of Law. She is a member of the American Law Institute.  She is the author of Homeownership and America's Financial Underclass: Flawed Premises, Broken Promises, New Prescriptions (2014).  She graduated from Harvard College and Harvard Law School.

References

Year of birth missing (living people)
Living people
University of Texas at Austin faculty
American lawyers
Harvard Law School alumni